Edward Christian John Hagen (March 4, 1908 - August 16, 1963) was an American male handball player. He was a member of the United States men's national handball team. He was part of the  team at the 1936 Summer Olympics, playing 2 matches. On club level he played for Cake Bakers Sport Club in the United States.

References

1963 deaths
Field handball players at the 1936 Summer Olympics
1908 births
American male handball players
Olympic handball players of the United States
Place of birth missing